Vadde Ramesh  (11 October 1947 – 21 November 2013) was an Indian film producer who produced movies in the Hindi and Telugu languages.

Background
Ramesh was born on 11 October 1947 in Elamarru Village of Krishna District. He made his debut in Telugu Film Industry in 1976 with the film Padavoi Bharateeyuda which was directed by Dasari Narayana Rao.

Death
Ramesh died on 21 November 2013 at KIMS hospital, Hyderabad, following cancer.

Filmography
Karnaa (1995) (Tamil)
Sri Edu Kondala Swami (1991)
Lankeswarudu (1989)
Viswanatha Nayakudu (1987)
Bobbili Puli (1982)
Rangoon Rowdy (1979) 
Katakatala Rudrayya (1978)

References

External links

Times Of India News - Producer Vadde Ramesh Passes away
Vadde Ramesh Dies of Cancer
Telugu Film Producer Vadde Ramesh Dies of Cancer
Hero Vadde Naveen father is no more

Film producers from Andhra Pradesh
Telugu film producers
1947 births
2013 deaths
People from Krishna district
20th-century Indian businesspeople